The Diocese of Ciudad Victoria is a Latin Church ecclesiastical territory or diocese of the Catholic Church in Mexico. It is a suffragan in the ecclesiastical province of the metropolitan Archdiocese of Monterrey. The diocese was erected on 21 December 1964.

Ordinaries
José de Jesús Tirado Pedraza (1965-1973) 
Alfonso de Jesús Hinojosa Berrones (1974-1985) 
Raymundo López Mateos, O.F.M. (1985-1994) 
Antonio González Sánchez (1995-2021)
Oscar Efraín Tamez Villarreal (2021-present)

Episcopal See
Ciudad Victoria, Tamaulipas

External links

Ciudad Victoria
Ciudad Victoria
Ciudad Victoria, Roman Catholic Diocese of
Ciudad Victoria
Ciudad Victoria